Monodilepas monilifera cookiana is a subspecies of small sea snail, a keyhole limpet, a subspecies of marine gastropod mollusc in the family Fissurellidae, the keyhole limpets and slit limpets. This species is known to occur in Cook Strait, New Zealand.

References

 Powell A. W. B., William Collins Publishers Ltd, Auckland 1979 

Fissurellidae
Gastropods of New Zealand